The Mediterranean-DASH Intervention for Neurodegenerative Delay diet, or more commonly, the MIND diet, combines the portions of the DASH (Dietary Approaches to Stop Hypertension) diet and the Mediterranean diet. Both the DASH diet and the Mediterranean diet have been shown to improve cognition; however, neither were developed to slow neurodegeneration (e.g. Alzheimer's disease). Therefore, a team at Rush University Medical Center, headed by Martha Clare Morris (a nutritional epidemiologist), worked to create the MIND diet. Like the DASH and Mediterranean diets, the MIND diet emphasizes the intake of fresh fruit, vegetables, and legumes. The MIND diet also includes recommendations for specific foods, like leafy greens and berries, that have been scientifically shown to slow cognitive decline. Recent research has shown that the MIND diet may be more effective at reducing cognitive decline than either the Mediterranean or DASH diets alone, though a cause and effect relationship has yet to be determined. Additional testing has shown that the level of adherence to the MIND diet also impacts the diet's neuro-protective effects.

Background and development 
Alzheimer’s dementia affects ten percent of the United States population who are older than 65. This is equivalent to 5.3 million affected individuals. The hallmark characteristic of Alzheimer’s dementia is cognitive decline. If the rate of cognitive decline could be slowed in the aging population, there could be significant public health and economic impacts. Recently, lifestyle medicine has been investigated as a potential means of reducing cognitive decline and other chronic diseases. Lifestyle medicine can involve alterations to one's diet, physical activity, and coping mechanisms. Various diets, including the Mediterranean and DASH, have been investigated with relation to cognitive decline. Although neither the Mediterranean nor DASH diets were specifically developed to slow cognitive decline, both were somewhat neuro-protective. In an effort to develop a diet specifically designed for cognitive protection, a group at Chicago’s Rush University Medical Center took components of the Mediterranean and DASH diets and combined them with recommendations from diet-dementia field. Specifically, the inclusion of leafy greens and berries have been shown in separate human and rodent studies to protect against cognitive decline. The MIND diet was validated through several studies using the Rush Memory and Aging Project; however, the cause and effect relationship between the diet and cognitive decline could not be determined.

Research 
The MIND diet is fairly new; the first article describing the diet and its efficacy was published in 2015. This initial study sampled from the Rush Alzheimer's Disease Center Memory and Aging Project and followed 960 participants over the age of 50 across a time span of five years. Changes in cognitive ability were correlated with specific nutritional components of the MIND diet. The inclusion of higher numbers of MIND diet recommended foods in one’s daily diet was associated with less cognitive decline than when these foods were not included or were included in lesser quantities. A follow-up study compared the effectiveness of the MIND diet to that of the Mediterranean and DASH diets within the same study population. The study showed that all the diets can be protective against the development of Alzheimer’s disease when they are strictly followed. The MIND diet also was effective at moderate adherence levels. The study also found that the MIND diet adherence was more accurate at predicting cognitive decline than either Mediterranean or DASH diet adherence. Although the MIND diet shows promising results, the findings must be replicated in other population based studies to confirm these conclusions. A drawback of the two studies discussed here is that cause and effect relationships could not be determined. A controlled, diet intervention study would be necessary to determine cause and effect.

When designing diets for the prevention of certain diseases, it is necessary to know the impacts of individual nutrients on the human body. The MIND diet could be improved by future research which investigates the impacts of individual nutrients or foods on neuronal physiology and anatomy. It is also beneficial to use dietary measurements that are culturally appropriate to enable researchers, dietitians, and the general public to draw accurate conclusions from the data.

Recommendations 
The MIND diet recommends:
 Whole grains: three or more servings a day
 Green leafy vegetables (kale, collards, greens; spinach; lettuce/tossed salad): at least six servings a week
 Other vegetables (green/red peppers, squash, cooked carrots, raw carrots, broccoli, celery, potatoes, peas or lima beans, potatoes, tomatoes, tomato sauce, string beans, beets, corn, zucchini/summer squash/eggplant, coleslaw, potato salad): at least one a day
 Wine: one glass a day
 Nuts: five servings a week
 Beans and lentils: at least three servings a week
 Berries: two or more servings a week
 Non fried poultry (like chicken or turkey): two times a week
 Non fried Fish: once a week
 Olive oil: use it as your main cooking oil.

The diet discourages:
 Butter and stick margarine: more than a tablespoon daily
 Pastries and sweets: more than five servings a week
 Red meat and pork: more than four servings a week
 Cheese: more than one serving a week
 Fried or fast food (like French fries, chicken nuggets): more than one serving a week

See also 
 List of diets

References

Suggested Reading 
 Berendsen AAM, Kang JH, van de Rest O, et al. (2017). Association of Adherence to a Healthy Diet with Cognitive Decline in European and American Older Adults: A Meta-Analysis within the CHANCES Consortium. Dementia and Geriatric Cognitive Disorders. 43(3-4):215-227. doi:10.1159/000464269.
 Dhana, Klodian et al. (2021). ‘MIND Diet, Common Brain Pathologies, and Cognition in Community-Dwelling Older Adults’. Journal of Alzheimer's Disease, 83(2) : 683 – 692. doi:10.3233/JAD-210107. MIND diet is associated with better cognitive functioning independently of common brain pathology, suggesting that the MIND diet may contribute to cognitive resilience in the elderly.
 Koch M, Jensen MK. (2016). Association of the MIND diet with cognition and risk of Alzheimer's disease. Curr Opin Lipidol. 27(3):303-4. doi:10.1097/MOL.0000000000000304.
 McEvoy, CT, Guyer H, Langa KM, Yaffe K. (2017). Neuroprotective Diets are Associated with Better Cognitive Function: The Health and Retirement Study. Journal of the American Geriatrics Society.
 Langa KM, Larson EB, Crimmins EM, Faul JD, Levine DA, Kabeto MU, Weir DR. (2017). A Comparison of the Prevalence of Dementia in the United States in 2000 and 2012. JAMA Internal Medicine. 177(1), 51-58.

Alzheimer's disease
Diets
Rush University